VA253 may refer to:
 Ariane flight VA253, an Ariane 5 launch that occurred on 15 August 2020
 Virgin Australia flight 253, with IATA flight number VA253
 Virginia State Route 253 (SR 253 or VA-253), a primary state highway in the United States